Switcher is a shunting locomotive.

Switcher may also refer to:
 Video switcher, a vision mixer
 Switchers Trilogy, compilation of stories by Kate Thompson
 Switchers (novel), by Kate Thompson
 Serial switcher, a person who continually moves his/her consumption from one company to another
 Switcha, a Bahamian cuisine beverage

Technology
 Application switcher, a keyboard shortcut
 Shift Switcher, a Compiz Fusion plugin
 Switcher (computer program), for Apple Mac
 X Neural Switcher, a free software (GNU GPL) computer program
 Network switch, a computer networking device that connects network segments
 Switched-mode power supply, a power supply that regulates its output using a switching regulator